This is a list of Croatian inventors.

B
 Zlata Bartl
 Josip Belušić
 Ruđer Bošković

D
 Ivan Đikić
 Igor Dvornik

F
 Vilim Srećko Feller

G
 Marin Getaldić

H
 Franjo Hanaman

J
 Aleksandar Just

K
 Franjo Kajfež
 Marcel pl. Kiepach
 Ivo Kolin
 Benedikt Kotruljević
 Ferdinand Kovačević

L
 Antun Lučić
 Ivan Lupis-Vukić

M
 Ante Maglica
 Peter Miscovich
 Andrija Mohorovičić

P
 Slavoljub Penkala
 Herman Potočnik
 Vladimir Prelog
 Mario Puratić

R
 Mate Rimac
 Lavoslav Ružička

S
 David Schwarz 
 Pavao Skalić
 Marin Soljačić

U
 Tomislav Uzelac

V
 Faust Vrančić
 Ivan Vučetić

External links
 Hrvati koji su mijenjali svijet ima ih više nego slutite, Politika plus

Inventors

Croatian
Inventors